The Sphere College Project is a project to create a high-quality, financially accessible educational institution for adults. It was founded in April 2009 in Phoenixville, Pennsylvania to provide education to adults who do not fit the prevailing model of higher education. The Sphere College Project is not currently a degree-granting institution.

Educational philosophy 

The educational philosophy of The Sphere College Project is influenced by other experimental institutions, including Black Mountain College and Hampshire College, and incorporates elements of self-organization. The underlying principle behind the organizational structure of the institution is that no one individual is capable of having sufficient knowledge of the system to completely design it beforehand. The institution reacts to its needs in real-time and must provide sufficient infrastructure to ensure progress toward the common goal, embodied in the mission statement. Since students process information in different ways, the institution must adjust to support their individual learning styles. The philosophy is based on the following disciplines, including the sciences (human/computer interaction; digital communication networks; digital gaming); the arts; and the humanities.

Program of study 

The program of study proposed by The Sphere College Project proceeds in three phases:

 In Phase I, Self and Other, students embark upon a journey to acquire a deeper understanding of themselves, and to develop their understanding of how similarly and differently people experience the world: to discover what motivates the beliefs and actions of humanity. This is accomplished primarily through reading, discussing and writing about works of literature and philosophy and their relationship to contemporary issues and the students’ own experiences. It also involves activities in the arts, sciences and humanities. In this phase students will seek to identify the direction of their future studies.
 Phase II, Tool Acquisition, involves the acquisition of interdisciplinary knowledge and skills to support and implement the student’s goals.
 In Phase III, Action, students draw upon their continually-developing knowledge to put their passion into action by implementing a project that is a good fit for the student.

Movement through the phases will proceed according to the schedule of the student. The Sphere College Project is not currently a degree-granting institution. It may, in the future, award degrees and seek accreditation.

References

External links 
 Official website for The Sphere College Project
  What Should Go in the Former Site of Sphere College?

Alternative schools in the United States
Educational institutions established in 2009
Schools in Chester County, Pennsylvania
2009 establishments in Pennsylvania
Adult education in the United States